Abantis vidua is a butterfly in the family Hesperiidae. It is found in Angola, the Democratic Republic of the Congo (Shaba) and north-western Zambia. The habitat consists of deciduous woodland.

References

Butterflies described in 1901
Tagiadini